Montana Highway 67 (MT 67) is a  state highway in the US state of Montana. The southern terminus is at an intersection with I-15 Business Loop (I-15 BL) and U.S. Route 2 (US 2) in Shelby, and the northern terminus is at Interstate 15 (I-15) on the north side of town.

Route description 
MT 67 starts at an intersection with I-15 Bus./US 2 in Shelby and proceeds in a generally northerly direction along Oilfield Avenue, running concurrently with I-15 BL. The highway ends at a diamond interchange with I-15 which also marks the northern end of I-15 BL.

Major intersections

See also

References

External links 

067
Transportation in Toole County, Montana